The 2023 CPL–U Sports Draft was the fifth annual CPL–U Sports Draft. Canadian Premier League (CPL) teams selected 16 eligible U Sports soccer players to be invited to their respective preseason camps with the opportunity to earn developmental contracts for the 2023 Canadian Premier League season.

Format
Players could be selected if they had one to four years of U Sports eligibility remaining, were in good academic standing, were planning to return to school the following year, and completed the CPL's draft declaration form by December 9, 2022. On December 12, the CPL released the list of 199 athletes who declared for the draft. Players who were selected can sign a full professional contract or a developmental contract, which allows them to return to university for the following season, without losing their eligibility.

Teams were able to retain the rights to previously drafted players who had signed developmental contracts. Players who had their rights retained and did not enter the draft were: Kareem Sow (HFX Wanderers FC), Jacob Carlos (Valour FC), Markus Kaiser (Cavalry FC), and Luca Ricci (Pacific FC).

Each CPL team made two selections in the draft with selections made in the reverse order of the previous season's standings, including playoffs and final standings. Expansion club Vancouver FC made the first and second picks of the draft but did not make a selection in the second round.

Player selection

The following players were selected:

Round 1

Round 2

Selection statistics

Draftees by nationality

Draftees by university

References

Further reading
 

2023 Canadian Premier League
2023
2023 in Canadian soccer
December 2022 sports events in Canada